Wang Zhonglin may refer to:

 Wang Zhonglin (politician), born 1962.
 Zhong Lin Wang, born 1961, a Chinese-American physicist, materials scientist and engineer.